Carolina Flores-Trinidad or Lina Flor (October 6, 1914 – February 11, 1976) was a writer from the Philippines. Writer of the hit radio drama Gulong ng Palad, she was also a "society columnist, bilingual fictionist, scriptwriter, biographer and lyricist, as well as a cartoonist, an actress, even a journalism teacher."

Career
Just barely out of her teens, Flor was signed up as a radio performer for KZIB, a small radio station where she hosted a morning program.  Eventually, she transferred to KZRM, then the biggest radio station, dominated by American executives and American talents.

In the middle of her success as a radio talent, Flor embarked on new career when was asked to edit a radio column for the Graphic. She later became a regular columnist for the Graphic when the publicity girl of Radio Manila (an American) resigned.

During this time, she also started writing short stories in English. In 1934, Flor published her first short story titled, “Big Sister.”  The story was said to have been "influenced by a painting of a young girl preening before a mirror.  “Big Sister” and eventually “Family Album” and “Grandmother Muses” landed in Jose Garcia Villa's annual Honor Roll."

With the Japanese occupation and eventually, the Second World War, the trend of writing shifted from English to Tagalog as to deepen the country’s sense of nationalism. 
To write was no longer done to satisfy the Muse; to write was to take a specific political position.  By shifting from English to Tagalog, the writers in English, perhaps unconsciously realized how inextricably related language was to the exploration of the world they lived in.

Thus, Flor decided to hone her writing in Tagalog and appeared to have reached the height of her power and creativity as a writer and performer.   She wrote several short stories in Tagalog for Sinag-tala, Ilang-Ilang, Magasin ng Pagsilang and Daigdig.  Aside from these, she started writing novel serials for Sinag-tala and Taliba, had regular weekly columns in Sinag-tala and a movie column for Ilang-Ilang.

During this time, Flor began writing radio soap operas. In 1949, Flor’s Gulong ng Palad aired over DZRH, and changed the face of radio programming.  Gulong ng Palad is considered to be the most popular daytime series in radio history.

In the following years, Flor was handling multi-media careers: as a feature writer (with famous personalities as her favorite topic), as an autobiographical essayist (concentrating on the numerous duties of being a wife and a mother), as a film juror, a social historian, even a cultural critic.

Later life
In the final years of her life, Flor, although always sickly and frail, continued to push herself into honing her craft. In 1972, Sparklers for the Day was published. Sparklers contained a day-to-day listings of events such as birthdays, wedding and anniversaries, etc. of prominent Filipinos. Letty Jimenez Magsanoc, then a young journalist, commented that Sparklers “feels intimate and personal and flipping through its pages seems snooping through someone else’s datebook.”

The following year, Flor embarked on poetry as she released Dilettante, a collection of light verses and four cartoons.  Although Flor described this collection as a product of “dabbling,” other critics considered Dilettante her masterpiece. 

Lina Flor died of a heart attack on February 11, 1976.  Numerous people, including her fans, co-workers, and others came at her wake; while many of her colleagues spoke and wrote about her death, constantly referring to her "goodness and generosity, her thoughtfulness and graciousness, truly a life lived for others."

References

1914 births
1976 deaths
Filipino writers
Filipino women writers